Keegan McHargue (born 1982 in Portland, Oregon) is an American artist known for his dream-like drawings and paintings. McHargue is sometimes described as either an outsider artist or faux-outsider artist. He lives and works in New York City.

About 
McHargue was seen as a successful emerging artist by age 21 and never attended art school. He previously lived in San Francisco, and briefly lived in Austin, Texas before moving to New York City.

In 2007, he created a body of artwork "The Yellow Spectrum" specifically for an audience of babies, and a few years later with the "Preteen" work his audience was teenagers and preteens.

In a 2010 interview, McHargue made comparisons between the fields of art and advertising. McHargue said about his process, "I tend to shy away from expressionistic concerns that compromise control. In a sense, everything in my art becomes about particular processes. That’s how process became the most important part of my painting. I always say that I’m not a particularly good painter but I’m a very strategic painter".

McHargue's work is in various public art collections including Museum of Modern Art (MoMA), Fine Arts Museums of San Francisco (FAMSF), among others.

Exhibitions
This is a list of select exhibitions by McHargue.

 2003 – "The Wolfman Cometh", solo exhibition, Rivington Arms, New York City, New York
 2006 – "The Control Group", Metro Pictures Gallery, Chelsea, New York City, New York
 2005 – "Drawing Circles", solo exhibition, Hiromi Yoshii Gallery, Tokyo, Japan
2004 – "Large Dudes", exhibition with Matt Leines, The Wrong Gallery, New York City, New York
 2004 – "Deliver Us From Evil: Dinos & Jake Chapman, R. Crumb, Honore Daumir, Dr. Lakra, Keegan McHargue", Matthew Marks Gallery, New York City, New York
 2004 – "Feel the Wind", Jack Hanley Gallery, San Francisco, California
2004 – "Incantations", group exhibition, Metro Pictures Gallery, Chelsea, New York City, New York
 2013 – "Prick of Conscience", solo exhibition, Fredericks & Freiser Gallery, New York City, New York

Publications

References

External links 
Keegan Mchargue Interview with Beautiful/Decay magazine in 2010
Interview with Keegan McHargue by The Believer magazine in 2010

1982 births
Living people
Artists from Portland, Oregon
Outsider artists
Artists from New York City